Edith Justine Øberg (October 5, 1895 – September 21, 1968) was a Norwegian novelist.

Biography
She was born in Lysekil, Sweden, and grew up in Kristiania, Norway. She was married to writer Hans Christian Lyche. She studied languages and music, and made her debut as a singer in 1915.

Øberg made her literary debut in 1916 with the novel . Her first major recognition came with her third novel:  (1921).

References

1895 births
1968 deaths
People from Lysekil Municipality
20th-century Norwegian novelists
20th-century Norwegian women singers
20th-century Norwegian singers
Swedish emigrants to Norway